Badoo is a dating-focused social network founded by Russian entrepreneur Andrey Andreev in 2006. It is headquartered in Limassol, Cyprus and London, United Kingdom, with offices in Malta, Russia and the United States. It operates in 190 countries and is available in 47 different languages, making it the world's most widely used dating network. The app is available on iOS, Android, and the web. Badoo operates on a freemium model, whereby the core services can be used without payment. As of 2022, it boasts of over 318 million users with approximately 41% being between the ages of 25 and 35 years old.

History 
Badoo was founded by Russian entrepreneur Andrey Andreev and launched in Moscow in November 2006. It has since ranked among the most popular dating websites. In 2016 it was the most-downloaded dating app in 21 countries. In 2011, Wired described Badoo as a "mass phenomenon" in Brazil, Mexico, France, Spain, and Italy.

In 2007, Badoo raised $30 million in funding. In January 2008, the Russian investor Finam Capital paid $30 million for a 10% stake in Badoo for expansion in Russia. As of 2009, Finam now has 20% ownership of Badoo.

After going viral on Facebook through popular social games and quizzes, Badoo was asked to adjust its approach. According to Insidefacebook.com, during the week of January 11, 2012, Badoo was ranked 17th in growing Facebook apps. The official launch of Badoo in the U.S. was on March 23, 2012, with Nick Cannon introducing the service in the United States.

In April 2017, Badoo launched a newly redesigned app and brand, adopting the colour purple and an orange heart symbol as its logo, as well as the tagline "Bigger than Dating". Andreev discussed this redesign in an interview with Business Insider James Cook in the same month.

In July 2019, Badoo was the subject of a Forbes investigative report outlining workplace misogyny, drug use, as well as sexual and racial discrimination. Badoo employees, including women, reported a culture of workplace afterparties involving use of recreational drugs and prostitutes, along with several instances of sexual assault and harassment.

Features 
Badoo has several features that enable users to meet people. When they first sign up, individuals select whether they want to meet new people to date, chat or to make new friends. Users can chat, match with others, upload photos and videos, as well as share their interests and see any friends in common.

The main features include:
 People Nearby: Users can see and contact people who live in their area, as well as those they 'Bumped Into' with this feature. 
 Search: Users can also see who is on the app in a different city or another part of the world. 
 Encounters: Another free feature, where users swipe right (yes) or left (no) on other users' profiles. If there is a match the two users are notified. 
 Video Chat: In August 2017, Badoo launched its video chat function that allows users to connect real-time, once they've exchanged messages. In 2018, Badoo was testing a livestream feature that was able to broadcast the video to several users at the same time but the feature was later removed.
Badoo has developed numerous safety features to ensure users are real and verified. Such features include the 'selfie request' button, through which women can request a man they're speaking to send a 'selfie' to prove they are the same person as in the pictures.

The company has also developed a photo verification process, where users upload a photo of themselves mimicking a specific pose. This photo is then verified in a minute by one of Badoo's 5,000 moderators.

Badoo is a freemium service, where the basic service is free for everyone but users have an option to pay for premium features. Such features include, ‘Rise Up’, which allows users to pay to give their profile more visibility on the site for a limited time. In late 2007, 20% of Badoo's then 22 million users were paying for heightened visibility at least once a month. However, according to The Economist, by 2011 only 5% of members were paying for the premium services.

Users can also pay to have their profile photo more widely visible across the site. "Super Powers" enables users to see more search results, as well as who wants to meet them and which of their messages have been read.

Criticisms 

In a peer-reviewed study by Cambridge University in 2009, it was given the lowest score for privacy among the 45 social networking sites examined. In the same report, it was given a ‘perfect score’ for verified accessibility on mobile devices.

Finnish newspaper Iltalehti reported that numerous Badoo profiles were created without people's consent, and that people have reported Badoo's actions to the police.

According to Google's transparency report on the requests for search removals stemming from the "right to be forgotten" ruling, Badoo had the eighth-highest number of URLs removed from Google Search, with Facebook, YouTube, Google Groups and Twitter receiving a higher number of these requests.

A CNET review by Rafe Needleman described Badoo's first impression as "creepy". He said that though the site was advertised as a way to meet local friends with shared interests, it was more like a photo-based dating site. He also said the way it matches users was "obscure".

See also

Hot or Not
Comparison of online dating services
Timeline of online dating services

References

External links 

 

Internet properties established in 2006
Online dating services of Cyprus
Companies based in Limassol
Mobile social software
Geosocial networking